Jannik Sinner was the defending champion but chose not to defend his title.

The final between Illya Marchenko and Enzo Couacaud was canceled due to the threat of coronavirus.

Seeds
All seeds receive a bye into the second round.

Draw

Finals

Top half

Section 1

Section 2

Bottom half

Section 3

Section 4

References

External links
Main draw
Qualifying draw

2020 ATP Challenger Tour
2020 Singles